Michael Myers (born December 16, 2001) is an American racing driver. He most recently competed in the U.S. F2000 National Championship with Michael Myers Racing in 2021.

Racing Record

Career Summary 

*Season still in progress.

Motorsports career results

American open-wheel racing results

U.S. F2000 National Championship 
(key) (Races in bold indicate pole position) (Races in italics indicate fastest lap) (Races with * indicate most race laps led)

References 

2001 births
Living people
Racing drivers from Indiana
Racing drivers from Indianapolis
U.S. F2000 National Championship drivers